The 2019 international cricket season was from May 2019 to September 2019. The 2019 Cricket World Cup in England and Wales took place during this time, starting on 30 May 2019. 10 Test matches, 78 One Day Internationals (ODIs) and 109 Twenty20 Internationals (T20Is), as well as 1 Women's Test, 9 Women's One Day Internationals (WODIs) and 130 Women's Twenty20 Internationals (WT20Is), were played during this period. Additionally, a number of other T20I/WT20I matches were also scheduled to be played in minor series involving associate nations. The season started with India leading the Test cricket rankings, England leading the ODI rankings and Pakistan leading the Twenty20 rankings. On 3 May, the International Cricket Council (ICC) expanded the men's T20I rankings to include all current Full Member and Associate members of the ICC, featuring 80 teams. In the women's rankings, Australia women lead both the WODI and WT20I tables.

Concussion replacements were allowed to be used in all international cricket matches from 1 August 2019, after the ICC approved changes to the Playing Conditions to this effect. A concussion substitute was used for the first time in international cricket when Steve Smith was replaced by Marnus Labuschagne after being struck on the neck by a bouncer in the second Test of the Ashes.

International men's cricket started with a one-off ODI between England and Ireland, which England won. The 2019 Cricket World Cup was held in England, starting in May. England won their first World Cup, beating New Zealand in a Super Over, after the final finished in a tie. Following the World Cup, the 71st Ashes series was played in this season. The Ashes Tests were the first Test matches in the inaugural 2019–2021 ICC World Test Championship. Australia retained the Ashes, after winning the fourth Test of the series. The series was drawn 2–2, the first drawn Ashes series since 1972.

In the one-off test between England and Ireland, Ireland were bowled out for 38 in their second innings. This was the seventh lowest innings total in Test history, and the lowest since England bowled New Zealand out for 26 in 1955. In the third Test of the Ashes, England were bowled out for 67 in their first innings and went on to win the Test; this is the first time since 1887 that a team has been bowled out for less than 70 in their first innings and went on to win the match.

The 2019 Romania T20 Cup saw several records set in men's T20Is. The match between Czech Republic and Turkey saw the Czech Republic equal the record for the highest innings total in T20Is (278), Turkey bowled out for the lowest total in T20Is (21), and the largest margin of defeat in terms of runs (257).   

In addition, several qualification events for the 2020 ICC T20 World Cup took place in this season. In the Africa qualifier, both Namibia and Kenya progressed to the 2019 ICC T20 World Cup Qualifier tournament. Jersey progressed from the Europe qualifier tournament and Singapore progressed from the Asia qualifier tournament. In the final qualifier tournament was the Americas group, which saw Canada and Bermuda progress. Qualification started for the 2023 Cricket World Cup this season, with the Scotland Tri-Nation Series kicking off Cricket World Cup League 2.

In July 2019, the ICC suspended Zimbabwe Cricket, for breach of the ICC Constitution, with the team barred from taking part in ICC events. It was the first time that a Full Member of the ICC had been suspended. As a result of Zimbabwe's suspension, the ICC replaced them in the 2019 ICC T20 World Cup Qualifier with Nigeria and the 2019 ICC Women's World Twenty20 Qualifier tournament with Namibia. In addition, the ICC suspended the Croatian Cricket Federation and the Zambia Cricket Union for non-compliance issues, and expelled the Royal Moroccan Cricket Federation as they continued to remain non-compliant with the ICC Membership Criteria.

Women's cricket in this season saw the conclusion of qualification for the 2020 ICC Women's T20 World Cup, with many of these events also being part of the 2021 Women's Cricket World Cup qualification process. Regional qualification groups saw teams progress to both the 2019 ICC Women's World Twenty20 Qualifier and 2020 Women's Cricket World Cup Qualifier tournaments. Zimbabwe initially qualified from the Africa group, before being replaced by Namibia. Papua New Guinea qualified from the EAP group, the United States qualified from the Americas group and the Netherlands qualified from the Europe group. The 2019 ICC Women's World Twenty20 Qualifier also took place during the season. Bangladesh and Thailand reached the final of the Qualifier to progress to the 2020 ICC Women's T20 World Cup. It was the first time that Thailand had qualified for a Women's T20 World Cup tournament. Bangladesh beat Thailand in the final of the Qualifier to win the tournament.

The 2019 Kwibuka Women's T20 Tournament saw several records set. Mali scored four of the five lowest innings totals in WT20Is, the lowest of which was six. In addition, the two highest innings totals in WT20Is was also set this tournament, with Uganda's 314/2 being the highest. In addition, four bilateral series were played, including the 23rd Women's Ashes, which was won by Australia.

Season overview

Rankings

The following were the rankings at the beginning of the season.

May

England in Ireland

2019 Ireland Tri-Nation Series

Pakistan in England

2019 ICC Women's Qualifier Africa

2019 ICC Women's Qualifier EAP

Pakistan women in South Africa

Afghanistan in Scotland

2019 ICC Women's Qualifier Americas

Sri Lanka in Scotland

Afghanistan in Ireland

2019 ICC T20 World Cup Africa Qualifier

West Indies women in Ireland

2019 Cricket World Cup

June

West Indies women in England

2019 ICC T20 World Cup Europe Qualifier

Zimbabwe in Netherlands

2019 ICC Women's Qualifier Europe

July

Zimbabwe in Ireland

Australia women in England

Zimbabwe women in Ireland

Zimbabwe Women were scheduled to tour Ireland to play three 50-over matches and three WT20Is. However, the tour was cancelled due to funding issues from Zimbabwe Cricket.

2019 ICC T20 World Cup Asia Qualifier

Ireland in England

Bangladesh in Sri Lanka

August

Australia in England

United Arab Emirates in Netherlands

India in West Indies and United States

2019 Netherlands Women's Quadrangular Series

New Zealand in Sri Lanka

2019 Scotland Tri-Nation Series

2019 ICC T20 World Cup Americas Qualifier

Afghanistan in Zimbabwe
In July 2019, the ICC suspended Zimbabwe Cricket. The country was scheduled to host Afghanistan for a Test match, five ODIs and three T20I fixtures. On 20 August 2019, the Afghan Cricket Board announced the Test and T20I squads for its first fixtures of the 2019–20 season, with no reference to the tour of Zimbabwe.

2019 ICC Women's World Twenty20 Qualifier

Final standings

 Qualified for the 2020 World Twenty20.

See also
 Associate international cricket in 2019

Notes

References

2019 in cricket